Viktoria usually refers to Viktoria, a name which is the same as Victoria (name), but may also refer to:

Places
 FK Viktoria Stadion, stadium of Viktoria Žižkov
 Viktoria-Luise-Platz, building in Berlin
 Viktoriastadt, now known as Victoria, Brașov

Popular culture
 Viktoria (singer), Filipina singer
 Viktoria (Maria Mena album)
 Viktoria (Marduk album), 2018
 Viktoria (film), directed by Maya Vitkova
 Viktoria (character), a video game character in the Thief series
 Viktoria und ihr Husar, an operetta in three acts

Sport
 Viktoria (trophy), the German association football championship trophy from 1903 to 1944
 Viktoria 07 Kelsterbach
 Viktoria 1894 Hanau
 Viktoria 89 Berlin
 Viktoria 96 Magdeburg
 Viktoria Aschaffenburg
 Viktoria DJK Coburg
 Viktoria Frankfurt/Oder
 Viktoria Köln
 Viktoria Neu-Isenburg
 Viktoria Plzeň
 Viktoria Žižkov

See also
Viktoriya
Viktorija (disambiguation)
Victoria (disambiguation)
Victor (disambiguation)
Viktor (disambiguation)